Vladimir Viktorovich Pivtsov (born 26 March 1960) is a former Russian professional footballer.

Club career
He made his professional debut in the Soviet Second League in 1980 for FShM Moscow.

Honours
 Soviet Cup finalist: 1982.

References

1960 births
Footballers from Moscow
Living people
Soviet footballers
Russian footballers
Association football defenders
FC Torpedo Moscow players
Neftçi PFK players
FC Zimbru Chișinău players
FC Fakel Voronezh players
FC Oryol players
FC KAMAZ Naberezhnye Chelny players
Soviet Top League players
Russian Premier League players
FC FShM Torpedo Moscow players
FC Spartak Kostroma players